Valentinov is a surname, derived from the given name Valentine. People with that name include:

Andriy Valentinov, the pen name of Ukrainian science/fantasy fiction writer Andrey Valentinovich Shmalko
Nikolai Valentinov, Russian socialist, journalist, philosopher and economist.

See also 

 
 Valentinovka, Inzersky Selsoviet, Arkhangelsky District, Bashkortostan, Russia
 Valentinovo, Croatia
 Walentynów (disambiguation)

Russian-language surnames
Patronymic surnames
Surnames from given names